Ilona Elek, known also as Ilona Elek-Schacherer (née “Elek"; May 17, 1907 – July 24, 1988) was a Hungarian Olympic fencer. Elek won more international fencing titles than any other woman.

Early and personal life
Elek was born on 17 May 1907 in Budapest, Kingdom of Hungary to a Hungarian-Jewish father born Eisler who 1939 converted to lutheranism and a Roman-Catholic mother. She had seven siblings, including two-time Olympic fencer Margit Elek, and her mother died when she was 11 years old. She graduated from a music school. For six years after Hungary entered World War II on the side of Nazi Germany, even before most of them were sent to concentration camps Hungarian Jews were forbidden from entering fencing competitions, and so Elek and her sister, who was also a half-jew, were unable to compete.

Fencing career

Elek competed for Hungary in three Olympiads, winning three medals.  She is considered to be one of the greatest female fencers in the history of the sport.

Hungarian National Championships
Elek won the Hungarian foil championship in 1946–47, 1949–50, and 1952.

World Championships
Elek won the gold medal in women's foil at the World Championships in 1934, 1935, and 1951. She won silver in 1937 and 1954, and bronze in 1955.

Olympics
Elek was the first woman to win two Olympic gold medals in the individual foil competition.

Elek's first Olympic competition was at the 1936 Summer Olympics in Berlin, Germany, at the age of 29.  She won the gold medal in the foil event, the first Hungarian woman to win a gold medal at the Olympics.  In the process, Elek, who was Jewish, defeated a German with a Jewish father, Helene Mayer.  The bronze medal went to Ellen Preis, an Austrian Jew.

The Games were cancelled in 1940 and 1944. When the Games resumed after World War II, at age 41 she repeated her performance as Olympic champion by winning a gold medal in the 1948 Summer Olympics in London, England.   It marked the fifth Olympics in a row where a Jewish woman had won the gold medal in foil. Ellen Preis again won the bronze medal.

Elek won the silver medal at the 1952 Helsinki Games.  After winning her first five matches in the final pool, she was in contention for the gold medal, but she lost to American Maxine Mitchell, and Italian Irene Camber, who won the gold.

Awards
She was later awarded the Robert Feyerick Cup and the Olympic Order.

International Fencing Federation
In 1983, she was the International Fencing Federation honorary President.

Later years and death
Elek later was a director of a trade company. She died in Budapest at the age of 81.

See also
List of select Jewish fencers

References

External links
Olympic record
Olympic site bio
'36 Olympics photo

1907 births
1988 deaths
Hungarian female foil fencers
Olympic fencers of Hungary
Fencers at the 1936 Summer Olympics
Fencers at the 1948 Summer Olympics
Fencers at the 1952 Summer Olympics
Olympic gold medalists for Hungary
Olympic silver medalists for Hungary
Olympic medalists in fencing
Jewish female foil fencers
Jewish Hungarian sportspeople
Jewish sportswomen
Martial artists from Budapest
Medalists at the 1936 Summer Olympics
Medalists at the 1948 Summer Olympics
Medalists at the 1952 Summer Olympics
20th-century Hungarian women